Kandy District is a district of the Central Province of Sri Lanka. Its area is 1906.3 km².

Administrative divisions

Ethnic groups and religion

Major cities

Suburbs of city of Kandy

 Peradeniya
 Katugastota
 Pallekele

Big towns

 Gampola urban council
 Nawalapitiya UC

Other towns
 Akurana
 Alawatugoda
 ((Ankubura ))
 Ambatenna
 Daskara
 Daulagala
 Galagedara
 Galhinna
 Gelioya
 Hanguranketa
 Hapugastalawa
 Kadugannawa UC
Katugastota
 Kundasale
 Madawala
 Menikdiwela
 Pilimatalawa
 Pussellawa
 Talatuoya
 Teldeniya
 Ulapane
 Watadeniya
 Wattegama UC
 Welamboda
 Weligalla
 Udadumbara

References

 
Districts of Sri Lanka
Kingdom of Kandy
Geography of Kandy District

ytytrytrrtytry